Paingottoor (പൈങ്ങോട്ടൂർ ) is a village in the Ernakulam district of Kerala state, India. It is located in the eastern part of the Ernakulam district and is bordered by the Idukki district. Paingottoor is 14 kilometres away from Kothamangalam, 16 kilometres away from Muvattupuzha and 15 kilometres away from Thodupuzha along State Highway 44 connecting Pamba and Kodaikanal.

Kedavoor (Kadavoor) revenue village represents Paingottoor gram panchayat jurisdiction at the Department of Land Revenue.

References 

Villages in Ernakulam district